Sheel Vardhan Singh,IPS is 29th Director General, of    Central Industrial Security Force was former Special Director of Intelligence Bureau from Bihar cadre (1986).

References

External links 
 https://www.cisf.gov.in/cisfeng/

Year of birth missing (living people)
Living people